Talal El-Chawa (born 4 May 1961) is a Syrian boxer. He competed in the men's flyweight event at the 1980 Summer Olympics. At the 1980 Summer Olympics, he lost to Emmanuel Mlundwa of Tanzania.

References

1961 births
Living people
Syrian male boxers
Olympic boxers of Syria
Boxers at the 1980 Summer Olympics
Sportspeople from Homs
Flyweight boxers
20th-century Syrian people